Jane Wallace is an American journalist. She was correspondent for CBS News as well as the news magazine West 57th.

Education
Wallace was one of the first female graduates of Yale College. While there, she also worked part-time at TV stations in Washington, D.C.

Career
After graduating college, she was an on-the-air reporter for a station in New Haven, Connecticut. Wallace was sent to Central America in the 80s by CBS. During her time at CBS, she covered two international stories, the exposition of US government's mining of a Nicaraguan harbor and the hiring of drug-smuggling pilots from the CIA. She also covered the riots in Haiti.

In 1994, she hosted the half hour news program Under Scrutiny with Jane Wallace on the new fX cable television channel.

Family
Wallace has an adopted son named Zach (Zachariah Max). She is the fourth of five girls and a son. Her younger sister named Susan (Suki) Wallace who used to work at a TV station in Chicago. She was a reporter at NBC's South Florida affiliate, WTVJ. Her sister passed away in January  2018, after a battle with cancer.

References

External links
 

Living people
American women journalists
CBS News people
Yale College alumni
1956 births
21st-century American women